Anton Gabriel Ryan Dworzak (born 3 March 2005) is an English professional footballer who plays as a midfielder for League Two club Swindon Town.

Career
Prior to his move to Swindon Town, Dworzak played for Procision Football Academy, similarly to team-mates, George Cowmeadow and Callum Winchcombe. He made his first-team debut during an EFL Trophy second round tie in November 2021 against Colchester United, replacing Harrison Minturn in the 89th minute as the Robins fell to a 2–1 defeat.

In November 2022, Dworzak and Town teammate Harvey Fox joined Highworth Town on loan. Both made their debuts in the 2-0 win at Biggleswade with Dworzak scoring the second goal. 

Dworzak returned to Swindon in December and made his senior league debut as a second half sub during the 1-0 away win against Barrow.

Career statistics

References

External links

2005 births
Living people
English footballers
Association football midfielders
Swindon Town F.C. players
English Football League players